Ian French (born 28 December 1960) is an Australian former rugby league footballer who played in the 1980s and 1990s.  French is the brother of fellow Queensland State of Origin player Brett French. While playing in the Brisbane Rugby League premiership in 1985, French won the Rothmans Medal as player of the season.

Playing career

Challenge Cup Final appearances
French played  for Castleford (Heritage № 647) in their 15-14 victory over Hull Kingston Rovers in the 1986 Challenge Cup Final during the 1985–86 season at Wembley Stadium, London on Saturday 3 May 1986.

Career records
Castleford's most tries scored in a match record is 5-tries, and is jointly held by; Derek Foster against Hunslet on 10 November 1972, John Joyner against Millom on 16 September 1973, Stephen Fenton against Dewsbury on 27 January 1978, Ian French against Hunslet on 9 February 1986, and St. John Ellis against Whitehaven on 10 December 1989.

References

External links
Ian French at thecastlefordtigers.co.uk
Queensland Representatives at qrl.com.au
Statistics at rugbyleagueproject.org

1960 births
Living people
Australian rugby league players
Castleford Tigers players
North Sydney Bears players
Queensland Rugby League State of Origin players
Rugby league locks
Rugby league second-rows
Wynnum Manly Seagulls players